Sunny Kaushal (born 28 September 1989) is an Indian actor who works in Hindi films. After working as an assistant director on the films My Friend Pinto (2011) and Gunday (2014), he made his acting debut in the comedy-drama Sunshine Music Tours and Travels (2016). He gained recognition for his supporting part in the sports biopic Gold (2018), and has since starred in the web series The Forgotten Army - Azaadi Ke Liye (2020) and the film Shiddat (2021).

Early life
Kaushal was born on 28 September 1989 in a suburban chawl in Mumbai to Sham Kaushal, an action director in Indian films and Veena Kaushal. His older brother is actor Vicky Kaushal. His family is Punjabi Hindu. Kaushal initially enrolled at The Institute of Chartered Accountants of India but later dropped out to pursue acting. He then started his acting career playing small roles in theater plays and skits.

Career
Kaushal made his Bollywood debut by playing the leading role in the 2016 comedy-drama road film Sunshine Music Tours and Travels and the TV Mini-Series Official Chukyagiri. He was also part of the short film Love at First Sight. In the 2018, Kaushal featured in Reema Kagti's historical sports drama Gold which is based on the national hockey team's title at the 1948 Summer Olympics. He portrayed the role of Himmat Singh, a character inspired by Balbir Singh Sr. For his role in Gold, he received a nomination for the at the 25th Screen Awards for Best Supporting Actor. That same year, he appeared in the TV Mini-Series Official CEOgiri, a spin-off of the 2016 series Official Chukyagiri. The short film The Embrace in which Kaushal plays the role of Siddharth was nominated in the Drama Short Film category at the Filmfare Awards.

Kaushal's next was the dance based film Bhangra Paa Le alongside Rukshar Dhillon which released on 3 January 2020 in select screens. Later that same year, Kaushal headlined Amazon Prime Video's original series The Forgotten Army - Azaadi Ke Liye. The series was directed by Kabir Khan based on true events of the Indian National Army fight for Indian Independence during World War II. The New Indian Express found his performance to be "splendid". A year later, he starred in the romantic drama Shiddat where he played the role of Jaggi Dil, a man who desperately tries to reach London to be with his love who is getting married to another man. After being indefinitely delayed due to the COVID-19 pandemic, the film premiered on 1 October 2021 on Disney+ Hotstar. Samriddhi Srivastava of India Today commented: "Kaushal’s dialogue deliveries and convincing performance will win your heart."

In 2022, Kaushal featured alongside Nushrratt Bharuccha and Vijay Varma in Hurdang, a love story set in the backdrop of the student agitation of 1990 in Allahabad. He has also completed the survival thriller Mili alongside  Janhvi Kapoor and Manoj Pahwa. He will also feature opposite Yami Gautam in a suspense thriller titled Chor Nikal Ke Bhaaga.

Media 
Kaushal was ranked in The Times Most Desirable Men at number 45 in 2018, at No. 38 in 2019.

Filmography

Films

Web series

Music videos

Awards and nominations

References

External links

 
 

21st-century Indian male actors
Indian male film actors
Male actors in Hindi cinema
Punjabi people
Living people
1989 births